This is a list of episodes from the first season of Barnaby Jones.

Broadcast history
The season originally Sundays at 9:30-10:30 pm (EST).

Episodes

Barnaby Jones (season 1)